Steinkjer Turnforening is a Norwegian gymnastics club from Steinkjer.

It was founded as Stenkjær TF on 9 October 1888.

Four Olympic gymnasts have represented the club: 1906 gold medalists Osvald Falch and Kristian Fjerdingen, as well as 1908 silver medalists Carl Klæth and John Skrataas.

References

 Official site 

Sport in Trøndelag
Steinkjer
Sports clubs established in 1888
1888 establishments in Norway
Gymnastics clubs in Norway